The Australian Grand Circuit for Pacers

History

The Circuit began in 1977 and was designed to be the showpiece of the Australian Harness Racing Industry with horses competing from every state within Australia. In 1992 New Zealand was admitted and the Circuit was renamed the Australasian Grand Circuit.

The best horses available are brought together to race for very attractive prizemoney. With the associated opportunities for promotion and marketing, this benefits both owners and harness racing clubs as well as the industry overall. In its first season in 1977, total stakemoney for the eight races forming the Circuit was $554,020.

The Grand Circuit has eliminated date clashes of major races which so often prevented the best horses from competing against each other to the detriment of clubs and the public.

Points were awarded during the Circuit, five points for a win, two points for second and one point for third.  The horse with the greatest number of points is crowned Australasian Grand Circuit Winner.  The Australian Harness Racing Council holds in perpetuity the Australasian Grand Circuit Trophy on which the name of each Grand Circuit Winner is engraved.

In the past there were a larger number of races (for example: 16 legs in 2005/2006) but in 2012 major changes were announced which reduced the number of races in the circuit, established minimum prizemoney levels and a new points system This was not popular with all industry participants.

Current events

Australasian Grand Circuit Winners

2021  -  King Of Swing
2020  -  King Of Swing
2019  -  Tiger Tara
2018  -  Lazarus
2017  -  Lazarus
2016  -  Lennytheshark & Smolda 
2015  -  Christen Me
2014  -  Christen Me
2013  -  Im Themightyquinn
2012  -  Smoken Up
2011  -  Im Themightyquinn
2010  -  Monkey King
2009  -  Blacks A Fake+
2009  -  Mr Feelgood  +
2008  -  Blacks A Fake
2007  -  Flashing Red
2006  -  Be Good Johnny
2005  -  Elsu
2004  -  The Falcon Strike
2003  -  Double Identity+
2003  -  Young Rufus+
2002  -  Smooth Satin
2001  -  Atitagain
2000  -  Holmes D G
1999  -  Christian Cullen
1998  -  Our Sir Vancelot
1997  -  Our Sir Vancelot
1996  -  Sunshine Band
1995  -  Golden Reign
1994  -  Jack Morris
1993  -  Franco Tiger
1992  -  Westburn Grant
1991  -  Westburn Grant
1990  -  Westburn Grant
1989  -  Our Maestro
1988  -  Village Kid
1987  -  Bag Limit
1986  -  Village Kid
1985  -  Preux Chevalier
1984  -  Gammalite
1983  -  Gammalite
1982  -  Gammalite
1981  -  San Simeon
1980  -  Pure Steel
1979  -  Koala King
1978  -  Pure Steel
1977  -  Paleface Adios

+ Denotes Tie

See also
Harness racing in Australia
Harness racing in New Zealand

References

External links
 Australasian Grand Circuit - Pacers
 Australian Harness Racing Council

 
Harness racing in Australia
Horse racing in New Zealand